Sitting volleyball at the 2018 Asian Para Games in Jakarta took place between 7 and 11 October 2018.

Medalists

Results
Detail Results :
 Win 2 Point / Lose 1 Point

Men
 Iran
 China
 Kazakhstan
 Iraq
 Myanmar
 Japan
 South Korea
 Indonesia

Group 1

Group 2

Final Round

Classification 7th/8th

Classification 5th/6th

Semi-finals

Bronze medal game

Gold medal game

Women
 China
 Iran
 Japan
 Indonesia
 Mongolia

Round 1

Final Round

Semi-finals

Bronze Medal Match

Gold Medal Match

See also
Volleyball at the 2018 Asian Games

References

External links
 Sitting Volleyball - Asian Para Games 2018
 RESULT SYSTEM - ASIAN PARA GAMES JAKARTA 2018

2018 Asian Para Games events